In Islamic religious belief, houris (Pronounced ; from ), are women with beautiful eyes who are described as a reward for the faithful Muslim believers in Paradise. The term is used four times in the Quran, where they are mentioned indirectly several other times, (sometimes as azwāj, lit. companions), and Hadith provide a "great deal of later elaboration". They have been said to have "captured the imagination of Muslims and non-Muslims alike".
Muslim scholars differ as to whether they refer to the believing women of this world or a separate creation, with the majority opting for the latter.

Etymology 
In classical Arabic usage, the word ḥūr is the plural of both ʾaḥwar (masculine) and ḥawrāʾ (feminine) which can be translated as "having eyes with an intense contrast of white and black".

The word "houri" has entered several European languages from around the 17th and 18th centuries.

Arthur Jeffery and other scholars suggests an Iranian origin for the term, proposing the origins of the word to be the Middle Persian hū̆rust 'well grown.' 

The 9th century Ardā Wirāz Nāmag, depicts maidens as hū̆rust ‘well grown’, with frāz pēstān ‘prominent breasts’, dēr... angušt ‘long fingers’ and hū̆ dōšagtar nigērišn abāyišnīgtar ‘a most pleasing and fitting appearance’. Many of these traits are also mentioned in the Islamic tradition. In Sūrah 78: 33, we see the utilization of adjectives such as kawā‘iba atrāban ‘full-breasted [companions] of equal age’ when describing the ḥūr. The Ardā Wirāz Nāmag (and the Avestan texts) specifies the “sweet smell” emitted from the maidens in the afterlife, even this trait is brought forth by the Hadith transmitter Ṣaḥīḥ al-Bukhārī 52: 53, ‘And if a houri [in the text: amratan] from Paradise appeared to the people of the earth, she would fill the space between Heaven and the Earth with light and pleasant scent and her head cover is better than the world and whatever is in it.”

Descriptions 
The houris are mentioned in several passages of the Quran, always in plural form. No specific number is ever given in the Quran for the number of houris accompanying each believer.

Quranic description 
In the tafsirs and commentaries on the Quran, Houris are described as:
 
 36:55 "Companions",
 37:48 "with large and beautiful eyes",
 38:52 "companions of modest gaze well matched
 44:54 wide and beautiful eyes",
 52:20 "beautiful houris of wide and beautiful eyes",
 55:56 "untouched beforehand by man or jinn", 
 55:58 "as elegant as rubies and coral", 
 55:72 "bright-eyed damsels in sheltered in pavilions", 
 55:74 "untouched by any man", "reclining on green cushions and beautiful carpets",
 56:8 "the people of the right, how ˹blessed˺ will they be"  56:22 and they will have "houris maidens with intensely black eyes set against the whiteness of their irises", 
 56:35 "created without the process of birth",
 78:31–33 and as "splendid companions",
 44:54 "Thus. And We will marry them to fair women with large, [beautiful] eyes".

It is thought that the four verses specifically mentioning Houri were all "probably" revealed at "the end of the first Meccan period".

Hadith description
Details of descriptions of houri (or ḥūr), in hadith collections differ, but one summary (by Smith & Haddad) states: 
<blockquote>they are generally said to be composed of saffron from the feet to the knees, musk from the knees to the breast, amber from the breast to the
neck, and camphor from the neck to the head.<ref>Kitāb aḥwāl al-qiyāma, p. 111. References to the general description of the ḥūr are abundant in the collections of traditions; see, for example, the summary and numerous citations of Ṣoubḥi El-Ṣaleḥ, La Vie Future selon le Coran. Paris: Librarie Philosophique J. Vrin, 1971, p.25. quoted in Smith & Haddad, Islamic Understanding,  1981: p.164</ref> Working often with multiples of seven, the traditionalists have described them as wearing seventy to 70,000 gowns, through which even the marrow of their bones can be seen because of the fineness of their flesh, reclining on seventy couches of red hyacinth encrusted with rubies and jewels, and the like. The ḥūr do not sleep, do not get pregnant, do not menstruate, spit, or blow their noses, and are never sick. References to the increased sexual process of those male believers for whose pleasure the ḥūr are intended' are numerous; the reports make it clear that the ḥūr are created specifically as a reward for males of the Muslim community who have been faithful to God.</blockquote>

In hadith, Houris have been described as "transparent to the marrow of their bones", "eternally young", "hairless except the eyebrows and the head", "pure" and "beautiful". Sunni hadith scholars also relate a number of sayings of the Islamic Prophet Muhammad in which the houris are mentioned.

 A narration related by Bukhari states that
 Another, reported by Muslim ibn al-Hajjaj Nishapuri, relates that
 Al-Tirmidhi reports
 According to a report transmitted by Ibn Majah in his Sunan:

Characteristics
Meaning of the term kawa'ib
Verse Q.78:33 describes Houri with the noun ka'ib,  translated  as "with swelling breasts" by several translators—like Arberry, Palmer, Rodwell and Sale—(it is also translated as 
"buxom" or "full bosomed"). At least two Islamic Fatwa sites (islamweb.net and islamqa.info) have attacked the use of these translations by those who "criticize the Quran", or who "seek to make Islam appear to be a religion of sex and desire".

Ibn Kathir, in his tafsir, writes that kawa'ib has been interpreted to refer to "fully developed" or "round breasts ... they meant by this that the breasts of these girls will be fully rounded and not sagging, because they will be virgins."  Similarly, the authoritative Arabic-English Lexicon of Edward William Lane defines the word ka'ib as "A girl whose breasts are beginning to swell, or become prominent, or protuberant or having swelling, prominent, or protuberant, breasts."

However, M. A. S. Abdel Haleem and others point out that the description here refers in classical usage to the young age rather than emphasizing the women's physical features.
Others, such as Abdullah Yusuf Ali, translate ka'ib as "companions", with Muhammad Asad interpreting the term as being allegorical.

Reference to "72 virgins" 

The Sunni hadith scholar Al-Tirmidhi quotes the Muhammad as having said:

However, others object that the narration granting all men seventy-two wives has a weak chain of narrators.

Another hadith, also in Jami at-Tirmidhi and deemed "good and sound" (hasan sahih) gives this reward specifically for the martyr:

(This hadith is sometimes erroneously attributed to the Quran.)
Sexual intercourse in Paradise
In the Quran, there is no overt mention of sexual intercourse in Paradise. However, its existence has been reported in hadiths, tafsirs and Islamic commentaries.

Houri, age
The virgins of paradise "they will be of one age, thirty-three years old," according to Ibn Kathir, (as reported by Ad-Dahhak aka Ibn Abi Asim) based on his interpretation of the word Atrab in Q.56:37).
But another interpretation of Atrab (in Q.56:37 and also Q.78:33) by Muhammad Haleen, describes Houri "as being of similar age to their companions". An Islamic Books pamphlet also states Houri will "have the same age as their husbands so that they can relate to each other better", but also adds that they will "never become old"; (Translations of Q.56:37 and Q.78:33 -- for example by  Mustafa Khattab's the Clear Quran and by Pickthall -- often include the phrase "equal age" but don't specify what the houris are of equal age to.)

On the other hand, the houris were created "without the process of birth", according to a classical Sunni interpretation of Q.56:35 in Tafsir al-Jalalayn, so that the heavenly virgins have no birthday or age in the earthly sense.

Other sources, including a tafsir of Ibn Kathir, (see above) emphasize the purpose of the use of kawa'ib in verse Q.78:33 "is to highlight the woman’s youthfulness",  though she is an adult, she "has reached the age when she begins to menstruate"; and that she is of the age of "young girls when their breasts are beginning to appear". At least one person (M Faroof Malik) translates  in verse Q.55:56 as "bashful virgins".

Quranic commentators
Sunni sources mention that like all men and women of Paradise, the houris do not experience urination, defecation or menstruation.

Ibn Kathir states that jinns will have female jinn companions in Paradise.

Contemporary
According to  Smith and  Haddad, if there is any generalization that can be made of "contemporary attitudes" toward the nature of the hereafter, including Houri, it is that it is "beyond human comprehension ... beyond time", that the Quran only "alluded to analogously".

Imam Reza
According to 8th Shia Imam, Imam Reza, the heavenly spouses are created of dirt (Creation of life from clay) and 
saffron.

Gender and identity
It has traditionally been believed that the houris are beautiful women who are promised as a reward to believing men, with numerous hadith and Quranic exegetes describing them as such.
In recent years, however, some have argued that the term ḥūr refers both to pure men and pure women (it being the plural term for both the masculine and feminine forms which refer to whiteness) and the belief that the term houris only refers to females who are in paradise is a misconception.

The Quran uses feminine as well as gender-neutral adjectives to describe houris,  by describing them with the indefinite adjective عِينٌ, which some have taken to imply that certain passages are referring to both male and female companions. In addition, the use of masculine pronouns for the houris' companions does not imply that this companionship is restricted to men, as the masculine form encompasses the female in classical and Quranic Arabic—thus functioning as an all-gender including default form—and is used in the Quran to address all humanity and all the believers in general.  

In The Message of The Qur'an, Muhammad Asad describes the usage of the term ḥūr in the verses 44:54 & 56:22, arguing that "the noun ḥūr—rendered by me as 'companions pure'—is a plural of both aḥwār (masc.) and ḥawrā' (fem.)... hence, the compound expression ḥūr ʿīn signifies, approximately, 'pure beings, most beautiful of eye'."

Annemarie Schimmel says that the Quranic description of the houris should be viewed in a context of love; "every pious man who lives according to God's order will enter Paradise where rivers of milk and honey flow in cool, fragrant gardens and virgin beloveds await home".

Relation to earthly women
Regarding the eschatological status of this-worldly women vis-à-vis the houris, scholars have maintained that righteous women of this life are of a higher station than the hooris. Sunni theologian Aḥmad al-Ṣāwī (d. 1825), in his commentary on Ahmad al-Dardir's work, states, "The sound position is that the women of this world will be seventy thousand times better than the dark-eyed maidens (ḥūr ʿīn)." Muḥammad ibn ʿUmar Baḥraq (d.1524) mentions in his didactic primer for children that "Adamic women are better than the dark-eyed maidens due to their prayer, fasting, and devotions."

Other authorities appear to indicate that houris themselves are the women of this world resurrected in new form, with 
Razi commenting that among the houris mentioned in the Quran will also be "[even] those toothless old women of yours whom God will resurrect as new beings". Muhammad ibn Jarir al-Tabari mentions that all righteous women, however old and decayed they may have been on earth, will be resurrected as virginal maidens and will, like their male counterparts, remain eternally young in paradise. Modernist scholar Muḥammad ʿAbduh states "the women of the Garden are the good believers [al-mu'mināt al-ṣalihāt] known in the Qur'an as al-ḥūr al-ʿayn, (although he also makes a distinction between earthly women and houri).

On the other hand, some narratives describe hur as each intended for an individual mo'min (male believer) and "waiting eagerly for him". They look upon the earthly wives of the prospective mates "as rivals, becoming annoyed when the wife is inconsiderate to the man who will come to her in the hereafter."  Earthly believing females (mu'mināt) in paradise ("daughters of Eve"), "are usually said to have one husband each", while males "are often portrayed as having all of their earthly wives plus seventy or more of the ḥūr". Verses that are thought to refer to women from earth in paradise (Q.2:25, 3:15, and 4:57) talk of "purified companions" [azwāj muṭahhara''], which distinguishes them from ḥūr, who are by definition "pure rather than purified".

Symbolism
Muhammad Asad believes that the references to houris and other depictions of paradise should be taken to be allegorical rather than literal, citing the "impossibility of man's really 'imagining' paradise". In support of this view he quotes Quran verse 32:17 and a hadith found in Bukhari and Muslim.

Shi'ite philosopher Muhammad Husayn Tabatabai mentions that the most important fact of the description of the houris is that good deeds performed by believers are re-compensated by the houris, who are the physical manifestations of ideal forms that will not fade away over time and who will serve as faithful companions to those whom they accompany.

Similarities to other religions

The houri has been said to resemble afterlife figures in a Zoroastrianism and Hindu narratives:
The Zoroastrian text, Hadhoxt Nask, describes the fate of a soul after death. The soul of the righteous spends three nights near the corpse, and at the end of the third night, the soul sees its own religion (daena) in the form of a beautiful damsel, a lovely fifteen year-old virgin; thanks to good actions she has grown beautiful; they then ascend heaven together.
Hindu stories include "Apsarasas", described as "seductive celestial nymphs who dwell in Indra's paradise," and among other things "the rewards in Indra's paradise held out to heroes who fall in battle." On the other hand, John MacDonald writes that "the origin" of  Huri "is unknown. Attempts to trace the development of the belief back  to Indian or Persian religion have not been successful."

See also 

 Apsara
 Garden of Eden
 Jannah
 Maid of Heaven (Bahá'í faith)
 Peri
 Women in Islam

References

Notes

Citations

Bibliography
 

 

Islamic eschatology
Female legendary creatures
Islamic legendary creatures
Jannah
Quranic words and phrases
Women and death
Islam and women
Sexuality in Islam